WQME (98.7 FM) is a non-commercial radio station licensed to Anderson, Indiana, serving the Indianapolis and Muncie media markets. Owned by the Educational Media Foundation, the station broadcasts EMF's Air1 network, playing Christian worship music.  Listener donations support the station's expenses.

WQME previously aired a locally programmed Christian adult contemporary format branded as 98.7 The Song. In December 2017, Anderson University, the owner, announced its intent to sell WQME. 

On May 31, 2018, the station ceased local programming, switching to the Educational Media Foundation's Air1 network. The university formally sold WQME to EMF outright on October 31, 2018.  The sale was completed on November 30.

References

External links
 

 

QME
Radio stations established in 1990
1990 establishments in Indiana
QME
Educational Media Foundation radio stations
Air1 radio stations